Albert James Carter (1898–?) was an English professional association football player of the 1920s. He joined Gillingham from a minor club called Zion in 1920 and went on to make two appearances for the club in The Football League.

References

1898 births
English footballers
Gillingham F.C. players
Year of death missing
Association footballers not categorized by position